Carl August von Steinheil (12 October 1801 – 14 September 1870) was a German physicist, inventor, engineer and astronomer.

Biography

Steinheil was born in Ribeauvillé, Alsace. He studied law in Erlangen since 1821. He then studied astronomy in Göttingen and Königsberg. He continued his studies in astronomy and physics while living in his father's manor in Perlachseck near Munich. From 1832 to 1849, Steinheil was professor for mathematics and physics at the University of Munich.

In 1839, Steinheil used silver chloride and a cardboard camera to make pictures in negative from the Museum of Art and the Munich Frauenkirche, then taking another picture of the negative to get a positive, the actual black and white reproduction of a view on the object. The pictures produced were round with a diameter of 4 cm, the method was later named the “Steinheil method.” It was the first daguerreotype in Germany.

In 1846, Steinheil travelled to Naples to install a new system for weight and measure units. Three years later, he was appointed to the Board of Telegraphy of the Austrian Trade Ministry. Steinheil was tasked with designing a telegraph network for the entire empire, and helped to form the Deutsch-Österreichischer Telegraphenverein (German-Austrian Telegraph Society). 
In 1851, he started the Swiss telegraph network. Steinheil returned Munich as konservator (curator) of the mathematical-physical collections and ministerial secretary in the Trade Ministry of Bavaria.

In 1854, he founded C. A. Steinheil & Söhne, an optical-astronomical company. The company built telescopes, spectroscopes and photometers – one of Steinheil's inventions, used to measure brightness. C.A. Steinheil & Söhne produced large telescopes for observatories in Uppsala, Mannheim, Leipzig, Utrecht. The company also produced refractors and reflectors with silver-covered mirrors. The process for creating the silvering was developed by Steinheil's friend Justus Liebig. In 1862, Steinheil's sons started managing the company.

Steinheil died in Munich in Bavaria on 14 September 1870. He was buried in the Alter Südfriedhof cemetery.

Inventions 

 Ground electricity
 Print telegraph (not made public)
 Electric clock
 Steinheil script (code to print dots on paper via telegraph, not used due to the adoption of Morse code)
 Steinheil doublet, a flint-first achromatic doublet
 Silver coating of curved glass surfaces (together with Léon Foucault) paving the way for the rise of reflecting telescopes.

Legacy 
Some sources state that Steinheilite, a transparent mineral that resembles blue quartz but is actually a form of iolite, was named after Carl von Steinheil. However, the name was in use as early as 1811, too early to be named after Carl von Steinheil, and sources from that time instead attribute it to Fabian Steinheil, the Russian military governor of Finland.

See also
Needle telegraph

References

External links
 

1801 births
1870 deaths
Engineers from Munich
19th-century German engineers
19th-century  German  physicists
19th-century German mathematicians
19th-century German inventors
19th-century German astronomers
Mathematics educators
Academic staff of the Ludwig Maximilian University of Munich
Alsatian-German people
Alsatian nobility
People from Ribeauvillé
Burials at the Alter Südfriedhof